The 1950 Tennessee A&I Tigers football team represented Tennessee Agricultural & Industrial State College as a member of the Midwest Athletic Association (MAA) during the 1950 college football season. In their seventh season under head coach Henry Kean, the Tigers compiled a 9–2 record and outscored opponents by a total of 267 to 80. The Dickinson System rated Tennessee A&I as the No. 4 black college football team for 1950 with a score of 25.56, behind only Florida A&M (28.76), Southern (28.50), and Maryland State (2800). The team played its home games in Nashville, Tennessee.

Schedule

References

Tennessee A&I
Tennessee State Tigers football seasons
Tennessee A&I Tigers